Arsen Zylyftari (born 12 March 1990) is an Albanian footballer who most recently played for Skrapari in the Albanian Second Division.

Club career
Following Naftëtari Kuçovë's relegation from the Albanian First Division, Zylyftari left the club and went on a short trial with newly promoted Albanian Superliga side Bylis Ballsh, where the signed a four-year contract on 18 July 2015.

References

External links
 Profile - FSHF

1990 births
Living people
People from Skrapar
Association football forwards
Albanian footballers
KF Poliçani players
KF Naftëtari Kuçovë players
KF Bylis Ballsh players
KF Butrinti players
KF Skrapari players
Kategoria Superiore players
Kategoria e Parë players
Kategoria e Dytë players